The Dancing Satyr of Mazara del Vallo is an over-lifesize Greek bronze statue, whose refinement and rapprochement with the manner of Praxiteles has made it a subject of discussion. It is an example of a dancing satyr, a sculptural archetype in Hellenistic and Roman art. Another well-known example is the Faun from the House of the Faun, Pompeii.

Style and details
Though the satyr is missing both arms, one leg, and its separately-cast tail (originally fixed in a surviving hole at the base of the spine), its head and torso are remarkably well-preserved despite two millennia spent at the bottom of the sea. The satyr is depicted in mid-leap, head thrown back ecstatically and back arched, his hair swinging with the movement of his head. The facture is highly refined; the whites of his eyes are alabaster inlays. 

Though some have dated it to the 4th century BCE and said it was an original work by Praxiteles or a faithful copy, it is more securely dated either to the Hellenistic period of the 3rd and 2nd centuries BCE, or possibly to the Roman "Atticising" phase in the early 2nd century CE. A high percentage of lead in the bronze alloy suggests its being made in Rome itself.

Rediscovery and display

Other well-known underwater finds of Greek bronzes have been retrieved from the Aegean and Mediterranean seas, generally from shipwreck sites: the Antikythera mechanism, the Antikythera Ephebe and the portrait head of a Stoic discovered by sponge-divers at Antikythera in 1900, the Mahdia shipwreck off the coast of Tunisia, 1907; the Marathon Boy off the coast of Marathon, 1925; the standing Poseidon of Cape Artemision found off Cape Artemision in northern Euboea, 1926; the horse and Rider found off Cape Artemision, 1928 and 1937; the Getty Victorious Youth found off Fano on the Adriatic coast of Italy; the Riace bronzes, found in 1972; and the Apoxyomenos  recovered from the sea off the Croatian island of Lošinj in 1999. 

Restoration at the Istituto Centrale per il Restauro, Rome, included a steel armature so that the statue can be displayed upright. When first displayed to the public after conservation (in the Chamber of Deputies in Rome, from 31 March to 2 June 2003), it was hailed as the finest new discovery in Italian waters since the Riace bronzes were found in 1972. On 12 July 2003 it returned to Mazara del Vallo, where it is on permanent display in the Museo del Satiro in the church of Sant'Egidio.  There, it is provided with an anti-seismic base, to secure it against tremors in this earthquake zone.  From 23 March to 28 June 2007 it toured to the Louvre for their Praxiteles exhibition, and an associated Louvre interactive installation, "Connaître la forme" ("Know your form"), displayed a replica of it lit in various ways to demonstrate the importance of lighting in displaying a sculpture.

See also
Hellenistic Greece

Notes

References
  Praxitèle, catalogue of the exhibition at the Louvre Museum, 23 March-28 June 2007, Louvre editions & Somogy, 2007 (978-2-35031-111-1)
 Alain Pasquier, "Praxitèle aujourd'hui ? La question des originaux", pp. 86–88,
 Jean-Luc Martinez, "Les Satyres de Praxitèle", cat. 72, pp. 284–291.
  Paolo Moreno, "Satiro di Prassitele", Il Satiro danzante. Camera dei Deputati, 1 aprile–2 giugno 2003, exhibition catalogue Milan, 2003, pp. 102–113.
  Roberto Petriaggi (dir.), Il Satiro Danzante di Mazara del Vallo, il Restauro e l'Immagine, proceedings of the conference held at the Istituto Centrale per il Restauro, Rome, June 3–4, 2003, Electa, Naples, 2005.
  Claudio Parisi Presicce, "Il Satiro Mainomenos di Mazara del Vallo: un Possibile Contesto Originario", Sicilia Archaeologica 36 (2003), pp. 25–40.

External links 
Il Satiro a Mazara del Vallo (Italian)
"The Dancing Satyr— A lost bronze by Praxiteles?
 Central Restoration Institute - English version
 An article in English about the Dancing Satyr
 About Mazara del Vallo and the Dancing Satyr

1st-millennium BC sculptures
1st-millennium sculptures
1998 archaeological discoveries
Archaeological discoveries in Italy
Hellenistic and Roman bronzes
Mazara del Vallo
Art of Magna Graecia
Nude sculptures
Satyrs